The following outline is provided as an overview of and topical guide to New Brunswick:

New Brunswick is a Canadian maritime province. It is the only constitutionally bilingual (English–French) province. Its urban areas have modern, service-based economies dominated by the health care, educational, retail, finance, and insurance sectors, while the rural primary economy is best known for forestry, mining, mixed farming, and fishing. New Brunswick's capital is Fredericton, and its largest city is Moncton.

General reference
 
 Common English name(s): New Brunswick
 Official English name(s): New Brunswick
 Adjectival/Demonym(s): New Brunswick/New Brunswicker(s)
 , Parisian ,

Geography

Geography of New Brunswick

 New Brunswick is: a province of Canada.
 Population of New Brunswick: 747,101(2016 census)
 Area of New Brunswick:

Location
 New Brunswick is situated within the following regions:
 Northern Hemisphere, Western Hemisphere
 Americas
 North America
 Northern America
 Laurentia
 Canada
 Eastern Canada
Atlantic Canada
 The Maritimes
 Time zones (see also Time in Canada):
 Atlantic Standard Time (UTC-04), Atlantic Daylight Time (UTC-03)
 Extreme points of New Brunswick

Environment

 Climate of New Brunswick
 Ecology of New Brunswick
 Geology of New Brunswick
 List of protected areas of New Brunswick
 Wildlife of New Brunswick

Natural geographic features
 Islands of New Brunswick
 Lakes of New Brunswick
 List of dams and reservoirs in New Brunswick
 Rivers of New Brunswick
 Mountains of New Brunswick

Heritage sites
 Historic places in New Brunswick
 National Historic Sites of Canada in New Brunswick

Regions

Native reserves

 List of native reserves in New Brunswick

Municipalities

New Brunswick municipalities
 List of cities in New Brunswick
 Capital of New Brunswick: Fredericton
 Geography and climate of Fredericton
 Demographics of Fredericton
 History of Fredericton
 List of mayors of Fredericton
 List of communities in New Brunswick

Demography

Demographics of New Brunswick

Government and politics

Politics of New Brunswick
 Capital of New Brunswick: Fredericton
 List of post-confederation New Brunswick general elections (last 5)
2018
2014
2010
2006
2003
 Political parties in New Brunswick

Branches of the government

Government of New Brunswick

Executive branch of the government
 Head of state: Queen of Canada, Queen Elizabeth II
 Head of state's representative (Viceroy): Lieutenant Governor of New Brunswick, Brenda Murphy
Previous lieutenant governors
Head of government: Premier of New Brunswick, Blaine Higgs
Previous premiers
 Cabinet: Executive Council of New Brunswick
Minister of Public Safety and Solicitor General
Minister of Finance
President of the Treasury Board
Minister of Natural Resources
Minister of Human Resources
Minister of Health
Attorney-General of New Brunswick
Minister of Education and Early Childhood Development
Minister of Transportation and Infrastructure
Minister of Agriculture, Aquaculture and Fisheries
Minister of Economic Development
Minister of Post-Secondary Education, Training and Labour
Minister of Energy and Mines
 Minister responsible for Efficiency New Brunswick
Minister of Government Services
Minister responsible for Aboriginal Affairs
Minister of Social Development (Canada)
Minister of Healthy and Inclusive Communities
Minister of Environment and Local Government
Minister of Tourism, Heritage and Culture

Legislative branch of the government

 Parliament of New Brunswick (unicameral): Legislative Assembly of New Brunswick
 Speaker of the Legislative Assembly of New Brunswick:
 New Brunswick Legislative Building
 Federal representation
 List of New Brunswick senators

Judicial branch of the government

 Federal Courts of Canada
 Supreme Court of Canada
 Federal Court of Appeal
 Tax Court of Canada
 Canadian court of appeal: Court of Appeal of New Brunswick
 Superior court: Court of Queen's Bench of New Brunswick
 Provincial Court: Provincial Court of New Brunswick
 Military court: Court Martial Appeal Court of Canada

Law and order

Law of New Brunswick
 New Brunswick Bar Association: the provincial law society
 Capital punishment: none.
 Canada eliminated the death penalty for murder on July 14, 1976.

Military

Canadian Forces
Being a part of Canada, New Brunswick does not have its own military.

Local government

History

History of New Brunswick

History, by period
 Pre-European era
 French Colonial era
 British Colonial era
 Since confederation
 History of the Acadians

History, by region

 History of Fredericton
 History of Moncton

Culture

Culture of New Brunswick
 Provincial decorations and medals
 Festivals in New Brunswick
 Cinema of New Brunswick
 Mass media in New Brunswick
 Museums in New Brunswick
 Music of New Brunswick
 Public holidays in New Brunswick

People

 List of people from New Brunswick
 Acadians
 William Bennett (clergyman)
 Ethnic groups in New Brunswick

Religion

Religion in New Brunswick
 Christianity in New Brunswick
 Islam in New Brunswick
 Hinduism in New Brunswick
 Judaism in New Brunswick
 Irreligion in New Brunswick

Sports
Sport in New Brunswick
 UNB Varsity Reds
 Moncton Aigles Bleus
 Moncton Mets (baseball)
 Moncton Miracles (basketball)
 Saint John Riptide (basketball)

Symbols

Symbols of New Brunswick
 Coat of arms of New Brunswick
 Flag of New Brunswick
 Provincial flower: purple violet
 Provincial bird: Black-capped chickadee
 Provincial tree: balsam fir
 Provincial motto: Spem reduxit (Hope was restored)
 Provincial capital: Fredericton

Economy and infrastructure

 Media in New Brunswick
 Mass media in New Brunswick (category)
 List of television stations in New Brunswick
 List of radio stations in New Brunswick
 Currency: Canadian dollar
 NB Power
 Horizon Health Network
 Vitalité Health Network
 List of hospitals in New Brunswick
 Transport in New Brunswick (category)
 Airports in New Brunswick
 Railway stations in New Brunswick
 List of New Brunswick provincial highways

Education

 Primary and secondary education
 List of school districts in New Brunswick
 List of schools in New Brunswick
 Higher education in New Brunswick
 University of New Brunswick
 Mount Allison University
 Université de Moncton
 St. Thomas University
 New Brunswick Community College

See also

 Outline of Canada
 Outline of geography
 Outline of Canada
 Outline of Alberta
 Outline of British Columbia
 Outline of Manitoba
 Outline of Nova Scotia
 Outline of Ontario
 Outline of Prince Edward Island
 Outline of Quebec
 Outline of Saskatchewan

References

External links

 
Official site of the Government of New Brunswick
Official site of Tourism New Brunswick
New Brunswick at the Department of Canadian Heritage
Maritime Tourism
Symbols of New Brunswick 
New Brunswick Museum
New Brunswick Lighthouses
Historical and Genealogical Resources of New Brunswick historical census, birth, marriage and death records, immigration, settlement, biography, cemeteries, burial records, land records, First Nations and more
From Louis to Lord: New Brunswick Elections, 1960–2003

Regions of New Brunswick
New Brunswick
New Brunswick